Green Oaks  is a small rural community in the Canadian province of Nova Scotia, located  in Colchester County.

References
Green Oaks on Destination Nova Scotia

Communities in Colchester County
General Service Areas in Nova Scotia